The Continental Cup 2010–11 was the 14th edition of the IIHF Continental Cup. The season started on September 24, 2010, and finished on January 16, 2011.

The Super Final was played in Minsk, Belarus on the 14-16 January, 2011.

The points system used in this tournament was: the winner in regular time won 3 points, the loser 0 points; in case of a tie, an overtime and a penalty shootout is played, the winner in penalty shootouts or overtime won 2 points and the loser won 1 point.

First Group Stage

Group A
(Jaca, Spain)

Group A standings

Note: SC Energija of Lithuania was scheduled to compete, however their flight to Jaca was cancelled when their sponsoring airline went bankrupt.

Second Group Stage

Group B
(Tilburg, Netherlands)

Group B standings

Group C
(Maribor, Slovenia)

Group C standings

Note: HSC Csíkszereda qualifies for the next round based on their win over Saryarka Karaganda.

Third Group Stage

Group D
(Rouen, France)

Group D standings

Group E
(Asiago, Italy)

Group E standings

Final stage

Final Group
(Minsk, Belarus)

Final Group standings

References

External links
 Official IIHF tournament page

2010–11 in European ice hockey
IIHF Continental Cup